The Cyrtacanthacridinae are a subfamily of Orthoptera: Caelifera in the family Acrididae.  They are sometimes referred-to as bird locusts, criquets voyageurs in French-speaking Africa, and Knarrschrecken in German.

It includes species of locusts, short-horned grasshoppers that undergo phase polymorphism and are among the most important pests of sub-Saharan Africa; they include the desert locust and the red locust, with the related Bombay locust in Asia.

One of the characteristics of members of this subfamily is the prominent peg between the forelegs: hence the name for the Australian Spur-throated locust.

Genera 
The following genera have been included with a single tribe separated:

Cyrtacanthacridini
Auth. Kirby, 1910; worldwide distribution (mostly tropical and sub-tropical)

 Anacridium Uvarov, 1923
 Chondracris Uvarov, 1923
 Cyrtacanthacris Walker, 1870
 Nomadacris Uvarov, 1923 - monotypic N. septemfaciata
 Ornithacris Uvarov, 1924
 Patanga Uvarov, 1923
 †Proschistocerca (P. oligocaenica Zeuner, 1937)
 Rhadinacris Uvarov, 1923 - monotypic Rhadinacris schistocercoides (Brancsik, 1892) from Madagascar
 Schistocerca Stål, 1873
 Valanga Uvarov, 1923
 Willemsea Uvarov, 1923 - monotypic Willemsea bimaculata (Willemse, 1922) from New Guinea

tribe unassigned

 Acanthacris Uvarov, 1923
 Acridoderes Bolívar, 1889
 Adramita Uvarov, 1936
 Armatacris Yin, 1979
 Austracris Uvarov, 1923
 Bryophyma Uvarov, 1923
 Caledonula Uvarov, 1939
 Callichloracris Ramme, 1931
 Congoa Bolívar, 1911
 Cristacridium Willemse, 1932
 Finotina Uvarov, 1923
 Gowdeya Uvarov, 1923
 Halmenus Scudder, 1893
 Hebridea Willemse, 1926
 Kinkalidia Sjöstedt, 1931
 Kraussaria Uvarov, 1923
 Mabacris Donskoff, 1986
 Nichelius Bolívar, 1888
 Ootua Uvarov, 1927
 Ordinacris Dirsh, 1966
 Orthacanthacris Karsch, 1896
 Pachyacris Uvarov, 1923
 Pachynotacris Uvarov, 1923
 Parakinkalidia Donskoff, 1986
 Parapachyacris Yin & Yin, 2008
 Rhytidacris Uvarov, 1923
 Ritchiella Mungai, 1992
 Taiacris Donskoff, 1986

Gallery

References 

 
Orthoptera subfamilies